The BBC General Forces Programme was a national radio station operating from 27 February 1944 until 31 December 1946.

History

Development
Upon the outbreak of World War II on 1 September 1939, the BBC closed both existing National and Regional radio programmes, combining the two to form a single channel known as the Home Service. The former transmitters of the National Programme continued to broadcast the Home Service until 1940, when the lack of choice and lighter programming for people serving in the British Armed Forces was noted. At that point, some frequencies were given to a new entertainment network, the Forces Programme.

The BBC Forces Programme was replaced when the influx of American soldiers, used to a different style of entertainment programming, had to be catered for in the run up to 'D-Day'. This replacement service was named the General Forces Programme, and was also broadcast on shortwave on the frequencies of the Overseas Service.

Programming
The BBC Forces Programme was launched to appeal directly to those members of the armed services during the Phoney War who were mainly sat in barracks with little to do. Its mixture of drama, comedy, popular music, features, quiz shows and variety was richer and more varied than the former National Programme, although it continued to supply lengthy news bulletins, informational and talk. However, when the American servicemen arrived en masse in 1943 and 1944 as preparation for Operation Overlord, they found even the richer Forces Programme shows to be staid and slow compared with the existing output of the American networks.

In response to appeals from General Dwight Eisenhower, the BBC abolished the Forces Programme and established the General Forces Programme, designed to provide a mixture of programming suitable for American and British audiences and also to appeal to the "Home Front", who research had shown wished to listen to the same output as the forces once fighting had broken out. As well as a large number of American network and Canadian Broadcasting Corporation programmes, the General Forces Programme also offered British programming:
 Shipmates Ashore – for the Merchant Navy, starring Evelyn Laye and Doris Hare
 Navy Mixture – with Joy Nichols
 Forces' Favourites – a record request show which later became Family Favourites
 War Office Calling the Army – information and news for servicemen
 Strike a Home Note – for Scottish servicemen overseas
 Welsh Half Hour
 SEAC – a newsletter for the South-East Asian theatre
 Hello GIs – a newsletter for Americans in Britain
 Mediterranean Merry-Go-Round – made up of Stand Easy for the British Army
 Much Binding in the Marsh – for the Royal Air Force
 HMS Waterlogged – for the Royal Navy

The General Forces Programme maintained the previous broadcasting hours of the Forces Programme on air each day from 6.30am until 11.00pm.

Closure
After Victory in Europe Day, the British longwave frequencies of the General Forces Programme became the BBC Light Programme on 29 July 1945. The service continued broadcasting by shortwave to areas that were still seeing fighting, and after Victory over Japan Day to occupying forces in each former occupied and enemy country.

As Britain began to disengage from each fighting area and civilian rule was finally restored and the soldiers demobbed, the reason for the existence of the General Forces Programme were faded. In each area, it was slowly replaced by the Overseas Service until its complete closure on 31 December 1946.

Further reading
 
 Graham, Russ J A new lease of life Radiomusications from Transdiffusion, undated; accessed 5 February 2006
 Hancock, Dafydd Forces of Light Radiomusications from Transdiffusion, undated; accessed 5 February 2006
 Took, Barry Laughter in the Air London: Robson Books 1976

External links
 Radiomusications from Transdiffusion

BBC Radio
Defunct BBC national radio stations
Radio stations established in 1944
Radio stations disestablished in 1946
1944 establishments in the United Kingdom
1946 disestablishments in the United Kingdom
1940s in the United Kingdom
United Kingdom in World War II
Radio during World War II
Military broadcasting